The Manville Company Worker Housing Historic District is a residential historic district encompassing an area of mill worker housing in the Manville village of Lincoln, Rhode Island. The housing in this district was built between about 1812 and 1890 by the various proprietors of the Manville Company, and feature a diversity of architectural styles, most of which are simple vernacular interpretations of styles popular at the time. Most of the houses are either 1-1/2 or 2-1/2 stories in height, with one or two units per structure, and are set on small lots. There are also a series of brick rowhouses, a relative rarity in Rhode Island mill housing of the period.

The district was listed on the National Register of Historic Places in 2009.

See also
National Register of Historic Places listings in Providence County, Rhode Island

References

Greek Revival houses in Rhode Island
Geography of Providence County, Rhode Island
Historic districts in Providence County, Rhode Island
Houses in Lincoln, Rhode Island
Historic districts on the National Register of Historic Places in Rhode Island
National Register of Historic Places in Providence County, Rhode Island
Company housing